Sega Lengko (Nasi lengko in Indonesian, Lengko rice in English) is a typical Cirebonese dish in Cirebon, Indramayu, Brebes, Tegal and surrounding areas.

The key components of the dish are white rice (ideally hot), fried tempeh, fried tofu, cucumbers (raw, freshly chopped), boiled bean sprouts, chives leaves (cut into small pieces), fried onions, peanut sauce (like salad seasoning, spicy or not depending on taste), and a light soy sauce poured over the top.

The fried tempeh and tofu are cut into small pieces and placed on a plate of rice. Chopped cucumber is sprinkled on top. Bean sprouts and peanut sauce are poured over it, with pieces of chives or spring onion leaves. After this, the soy sauce is drizzled over. Lastly, the dish is given a sprinkle of fried onions. The dish is often served with aci crackers, a white, round or square condiment. Aci crackers smeared with ketchup are a popular appetizer.

Nasi lengko is usually served with five to ten sticks of satay on the side.

See also

 Sega Jamblang
 Empal gentong

Cirebonese cuisine
Indonesian rice dishes